"Dundee" is the eighth episode of the second season of HBO satirical comedy-drama television series Succession, and the 18th overall. It was written by Mary Laws and directed by Kevin Bray, and aired on September 29, 2019.

In the episode, the Roys travel to Dundee, Scotland, Logan's birthplace, to celebrate his 50th anniversary as CEO of Waystar RoyCo.

Plot
The Roys attend the premiere of Willa's play; Kendall seduces Jennifer, one of the actresses. The next day, the Roy children record messages for Logan's 50th anniversary at Waystar, which will be celebrated in his hometown of Dundee, Scotland. On the plane, the Roys learn that a disgruntled former employee of the company is ready to be a whistleblower for the cruises scandal.

In Dundee, Shiv confronts Rhea about her opportunistic behavior, accusing her of an attempt to take over the company. While Logan is away, Marcia passive-aggressively indicates to Rhea that she knows of her affair with Logan. During a family meeting, Shiv enlists the aid of her siblings to sabotage Rhea's image to Logan in various ways. Kendall, meanwhile, has Jennifer flown to Dundee despite Connor's protestations over depriving Willa's play of a cast member.

While touring a state-of-the-art news building dedicated to Logan, Kendall admits to Rhea that he isn't genuinely working against her. Rhea suggests that Kendall is Logan's most likely successor at the company. Ewan arrives in Dundee, and gives Greg an ultimatum: either quit working for Logan, or lose Ewan's $250 million inheritance. Shiv struggles to convince her brothers to work with her against Rhea, as none of them seem to have as much of a problem with her.

Rhea has arranged an elaborate gala celebrating Logan's 50 years at the company, having invited hundreds of guests, well beyond Logan's expectations. Logan and Shiv agree to a "truce" for the night. Shiv meets with Gerri, Hugo, Cyd, Frank and Karolina, who inform her that the company whistleblower is refusing even the quadrupled settlement of $20 million to withdraw his statement. Shiv decides not to concern her father with the details of the scandal during his celebration.

During speeches for Logan, Kendall surprises the audience with a rap performance. He later has Jennifer sent home after she comes across as awkward and shallow when he introduces her to Logan. Roman and Eduard Asgarov tell Logan they have purchased the Hearts football club as a gift, only to be reminded that Logan in fact supports the rival Hibs. Shiv realizes that Rhea will have to bear the brunt of the cruises scandal if she were placed in charge of the company, and gives Logan her approval to name Rhea as his successor. Logan makes the announcement during his speech. Marcia, feeling betrayed, leaves the event. As Logan prepares to unveil his plaque commemorating his 50 years at the company, Ewan confronts his brother, warning him that he will face a reckoning for his actions, before Logan finds the plaque has been dedicated to their mother rather than himself.

Production

The episode was filmed on location in Dundee, and some scenes take place in the newly-opened V&A Dundee. The production received £400,000 in public money from Screen Scotland for filming portions of "Dundee" and the previous episode, "Return", in Dundee and other Scottish locations. On an episode of Jimmy Kimmel Live!, actor Brian Cox revealed that the decision to make Logan's birthplace Dundee - which is Cox's real-life hometown - was made late in the production of the first season as a "surprise" from showrunner Jesse Armstrong, after Cox had already completed filming most of the episodes.

Kendall's rap for Logan during his 50th anniversary ceremony, "L to the OG", was released as a single on May 20, 2020.

Reception

Ratings
Upon airing, the episode was watched by 0.579 million viewers, with an 18-49 rating of 0.11.

Critical reception
"Dundee" received critical acclaim. On Rotten Tomatoes, the episode has a rating of 94% based on 17 reviews, with the critics' consensus stating, "With Kendall's cringe-worthy rap performance, the battle of wits between Rhea and Shiv, and Logan's reluctant return to his hometown, "Dundee" makes for a sublimely exciting episode."

Randall Colburn of The A.V. Club, gave the episode a B+, praising the piecemeal, ambiguous way in which the series provides details on Logan's past: "There’s no flashback episode, no ready-made narrative about absent fathers, loving mothers, and persevering beyond abuse. Instead, details of Logan’s past bob up as they do in his mind, only to be shoved back down into the dark corners he leaves unswept." Colburn also praised Kendall's rap as "a weird, humanizing moment of total lameness for all of these rich, untouchable people." Scott Tobias of Vulture gave the episode 4 stars out of 5, comparing Kendall's rap to Karl Rove's comedic rap performance at a 2007 radio and television correspondents' dinner. Tobias also remarked on the "mythological" nature of Logan's characterization in the episode, and praised the subplot involving Connor and Willa's play. Vox praised Sarah Snook's performance in depicting Shiv becoming both "sharper and stupider" as her conflict with Rhea became more pronounced, and favorably compared the episode to the previous week's "Return".

Accolades
For the episode, James Cromwell received a nomination for Outstanding Guest Actor in a Drama Series at the 72nd Primetime Emmy Awards.

References

External links
 "Dundee" at HBO
 

2019 American television episodes
Succession (TV series)
Television episodes directed by Kevin Bray (director)